Jan Panenka (8 July 192212 July 1999) was a Czech pianist. He recorded many of Beethoven's works, and he played for many years with the Suk Trio.

Life 
Jan Panenka began his concert career in 1944, as a pupil of František Maxián at the Prague Conservatory. In 1951 he was awarded the 2nd prize at the Prague Spring International Music Competition. He attracted attention in 1959, on a concert tour to Australia and Japan with the Czech Philharmonic. Panenka interrupted his career in 1979, due to hand problems. He worked as a conductor, but later returned to the piano and made recordings with the Smetana Quartet. He worked also as a teacher at the Academy of Performing Arts in Prague.

As a soloist with the Czech Philharmonic he made also a number of gramophone recordings, including the complete piano concertos of Ludwig van Beethoven (1964–71).  He was awarded the Grand Prix du Disque for the recording of violin sonatas by Leoš Janáček and Claude Debussy, with Josef Suk.

Discography 
His recordings include works by:
 Ludwig van Beethoven
 Johannes Brahms
 Antonín Dvořák
 Leoš Janáček
 Bohuslav Martinů
 Franz Schubert
 Robert Schumann
 Josef Suk

He performed with the following musicians:
 Josef Suk
 Panocha Quartet
 Suk Trio
 Josef Chuchro
 Saša Večtomov
 Czech Philharmonic Orchestra
 Prague Symphony Orchestra

References 
 [ Allmusic.com: Jan Panenka]
 Supraphon - 60th anniversary
 ClassicsToday.com Review Digest for Performances by Jan Panenka

Footnotes 

1922 births
1999 deaths
Czech classical musicians
Czech classical pianists
20th-century classical pianists
Czechoslovak pianists